Iacopo Galli (born 30 September 1993) is an Italian football player.

Club career
He made his Serie C debut for Pontedera on 29 September 2013 in a game against Benevento.

References

External links
 

1993 births
People from Carrara
Sportspeople from the Province of Massa-Carrara
Living people
Italian footballers
U.S. Livorno 1915 players
S.S.D. Lucchese 1905 players
U.S. Città di Pontedera players
F.C. Crotone players
Spezia Calcio players
Casertana F.C. players
Serie B players
Serie C players
Serie D players
Association football defenders
Footballers from Tuscany